The Cathedral of the Holy Child is the National Cathedral of the Iglesia Filipina Independiente (Philippine Independent Church) and the seat of the Obispo Maximo (Supreme Bishop), the Church's chief pastor and spiritual head, located in Ermita, Manila, Philippines. It was built in 1969 and was dedicated to the honor of the Holy Infant Jesus, patron of Tondo, Manila. It replaced the first cathedral in Tondo, which was completely destroyed during World War II.

History

First Central Church and Tondo Cathedral
[[File:Aglipayan Old Tondo Cathedral.jpg|thumb|left|175px|The Tondo Cathedral was the Iglesia Filipina Independiente'''s first national cathedral along Calle Azcarraga (now Claro M. Recto Avenue) in Tondo, Manila which was established in 1905. It was destroyed during the Second World War in 1945.]]
The Iglesia Filipina Independiente's first central church was actually the ground floor of a big house located at 488 Calle Lemery (now Juan Luna Street), a few meters away from Paseo de Azcarraga, in Tondo, Manila. Doña Saturnina Salazar, the mother-in-law of Felipe Buencamino and known as the wealthy and grand old lady of Tondo, was the owner. It was in that same house on October 26, 1902, where the historic grand inauguration, launching, and celebration of the first Solemn High Mass of Gregorio Aglipay, the first Supreme Bishop, was held. After the historic event, Doña Saturnina also volunteered to finance the building of the National Cathedral in a lot she voluntarily donated to the church, but without deed.

In January 1905, the National Cathedral was inaugurated and blessed. Also known as the Tondo Cathedral, the church stood on a 2,000-square-meter lot at 227 (formerly 111) Calle Azcarraga (now Claro M. Recto Avenue), but was totally destroyed on February 6, 1945, through the indiscriminate bombing by American forces during World War II. Felix de la Cruz was assigned as the first priest of Tondo Cathedral, where he served from 1905 until his death in 1907. He was succeeded by Santiago Fonacier, who later became the second Supreme Bishop.

With the destruction of the National Cathedral, gone too was the church's lot when it was recovered by the heirs of Saturnina Salazar. For over twenty years, the church was without a national center of worship. While there were plans to build a National Cathedral after the war, the attention of the national leadership was diverted to solve the many internal problems besetting the church. The María Clara Christ Church at V. Concepción Street in Santa Cruz, Manila served as the temporary national center of worship.

 Construction of the National Cathedral 

On the centenary of the birth of Gregorio Aglipay in 1960, a fundraising program was launched to build a National Cathedral on a lot in Ermita, Manila owned by the Protestant Episcopal Church in the United States of America, which the latter offered to the church. The lot has an area of 3,501.50 square meters. A big house used to stand on the property, which served as the official residence of the Missionary Bishop of the Episcopal Church.

The property was first leased to the church for a term of 99 years by virtue of a lease contract executed on February 25, 1966, between the Domestic and Foreign Missionary Society of the Protestant Episcopal Church in the United States of America and the Iglesia Filipina Independiente, in consideration of the sum of PHP 4.00. The Most Rev. Isabelo L. de los Reyes, Jr. (the fourth Supreme Bishop) and the Most Rev. John E. Hines (then Presiding Bishop of the Episcopal Church) respectively signed the Contract during a fitting ceremony held in Manila. In 1972, by virtue again of the said contract, the lessor Domestic and Foreign Missionary Society of the Protestant Episcopal Church in the United States of America voluntarily ceded and conveyed unto the lessee Iglesia Filipina Independiente ownership in fee simple of the said property and all improvements thereon, subject however, to certain conditions.

A groundbreaking and cornerstone laying was held for the building of the National Cathedral on December 18, 1964. Since then, a massive nationwide fundraising campaign was spearheaded by the Supreme Bishop and the National Cathedral Commission, with contributions from among the members and sympathizers of the Church. The National Cathedral was designed by Architect Carlos D. Arguelles.

Coinciding with the 109th birth anniversary of the first Supreme Bishop, the National Cathedral was blessed and inaugurated on May 8, 1969. Thousands of faithful and several Catholic and Protestant church leaders throughout the world attended and joined the long procession from T.M. Kalaw Street to the site of the blessing and inauguration. The National Cathedral was dedicated to the Holy Infant Jesus, the Patron Saint of the first National Cathedral in Tondo. Almost all major newspapers covered and editorialized the historic occasion.

Bishop Soliman F. Ganno was appointed as its first Dean, having served from 1969 to 1970.

In 1973, by virtue of Motion 73-17 and following the recommendation of then-Supreme Bishop Macario V. Ga, the Supreme Council of Bishops approved that "the Cathedral of the Holy Child be autonomous and with independent Episcopal jurisdiction, having the same status of a Diocese, and, further, it shall enjoy full representation in the General Assembly of the Philippine Independent Church.''"

The National Cathedral is also administered by the Supreme Bishop as a separate diocese. At present, the Canon to the Obispo Maximo serves distinctly from the Dean.

References

External links 

Churches in Manila
Buildings and structures in Ermita
1905 establishments in the Philippines
Religious buildings and structures completed in 1969
Churches completed in 1969
Modernist architecture
Philippine Independent Church
20th-century churches in the Philippines